Isentällispitz (2,873 m) is a mountain of the Silvretta Alps, located on the border between Austria and Switzerland. The closest locality is Klosters on the Swiss side.

References

External links
 Isentällispitz on Hikr

Mountains of the Alps
Mountains of Graubünden
Mountains of Vorarlberg
Austria–Switzerland border
International mountains of Europe
Mountains of Switzerland
Two-thousanders of Switzerland
Silvretta Alps
Klosters-Serneus